Sonny Condell (born 1 July 1949, in Newtownmountkennedy, Ireland) is an Irish singer-songwriter, multi-instrumentalist, and graphic artist. He is mainly known as a member of the Irish bands Tír na nÓg and Scullion. He released some hits in Ireland as a solo artist such as "Down in the City" in 1977 that he covered later with the Belgian singer Micha Marah on her album Voyage in 1998. For some years, Condell had his own solo band called Radar, although he still plays with Tír na nÓg and Scullion.

Discography

With Tramcarr 88
 "Look"/"In the Morning" (1968)

With Tír na nÓg
 Tír na nÓg (1971)
 A Tear and a Smile (1972)
 Strong in the Sun (1973)
 In the Morning (1999)
 Hibernian (2000)
 Spotlight (2001)
 Live at Sirius (2010)
 The Dark Dance (2015)
 Live 1970 - '71 (2022)

Solo
 Camouflage (1977)
 Someone to Dance With (1994)
 French Windows (1999)
 Backwater Awhile (2001)
 Swallows and Farms (2013)
 Seize the Day (2017)

With Scullion
 Scullion (1979)
 Balance and Control (1980)
 White Side of Night (1983)
 Spin (1985)
 Ghosts and Heroes (1992)
 Eyelids into Snow – A Collection (2001)
 Long Wave (2012)

With Radar
 Navigation (2005)

As producer
 Tadhg Mac Dhonnagáin – Solas Gorm (1988)
 Mike Hanrahan – What You Know (2002)

Guest appearances
 Tudor Lodge – Tudor Lodge (1971)
 Ray Dolan – Restless Night (1975)
 Tadhg Mac Dhonnagáin – Solas Gorm (1988)
 Micha Marah – Voyage (1998)
 Dervish – 21 Years from Stage to Stage (2010)
 Leo O'Kelly – Will (2011)

References

External links
Official Web Site

Living people
1949 births
Jaw harp players
Irish male singers
Irish songwriters